Sara Dosa is an American documentary director and producer. Dosa wrote, produced and directed the 2022 documentary film Fire of Love, which was nominated for a BAFTA and an Academy Award. Dosa won the 2023 DGA Award for Outstanding Directing for the film. Her other works have received Emmy and Independent Spirit Award, as well a Peabody win. 

Her directing work focuses on the human relationship with non-human nature, often exploring themes of interconnection, myth, ecology and economy told through personal character stories.

Early life
Dosa is a graduate of Wesleyan University and has a master's degree in cultural anthropology and international development studies from the London School of Economics & Political Science where her work focused on critical theory, the anthropology of economy and geographies of power.

Career
Dosa's first film as a director was 2014's The Last Season, which followed two war veterans turned wild mushroom hunters who form an unexpected friendship in the Oregon woods. It was nominated for the Independent Spirit "Truer Than Fiction" Award in 2015. In 2018 Dosa and Academy Award-winner Barbara Kopple co-directed an Emmy-nominated episode of Netflix's ReMastered Series, Tricky Dick & The Man in Black. That same year, Dosa was inducted into the Academy of Motion Picture Arts & Sciences, Documentary Branch in 2018.

In 2019 she directed and produced The Seer & The Unseen, about Icelandic seer Ragnhildur Jónsdóttir, who communicates with spirits of nature. The feature won awards at film festivals worldwide and was acquired by Utopia Distribution.

In 2022, Dosa directed Fire of Love which premiered at the Sundance Film Festival as the Day One film in US Documentary Competition. Fire of Love won the Jonathan Oppenheimer Editing Award for editors Erin Casper and Jocelyne Chaput and received critical acclaim, named by Indiewire as the top documentary out of Sundance in a survey of 135 critics. Fire of Love was acquired by National Geographic Films and was released in 2022. Fire of Love was nominated for an Academy Award for Best Documentary Feature Film at the 95th Academy Awards.

Filmography
Director
The Last Season (2014)
Tricky Dick & The Man in Black (2018) 
The Seer & The Unseen (2019)
Fire of Love (2022)

Producer
The Last Season (2014)
Audrie & Daisy (2016)
An Inconvenient Sequel: Truth to Power (2017)
Melting Ice (2017)
Survivors (2018)
The Edge of Democracy (2019)
The Seer & The Unseen (2019)
Extase (2020)
Fire of Love (2022)

Writer
Fire of Love (2022)

Awards and nominations

References

External links
Dosa, Sara - Filmmaker.
Sara Dosa
Sara Dosa
Spirit Awards 2015: The Complete Winners List
Critics Survey: The Best Movies of Sundance 2022 According to 135 Critics

Living people
Year of birth missing (living people)
American documentary filmmakers
American documentary film producers
Alumni of the London School of Economics
Wesleyan University alumni